Sardinella fijiense also known as the Fiji sardinella is a species of ray-finned fish in the genus Sardinella.

References
 

Sardinella
Fish described in 1923